The Dolebludgers is a 1979 Australian TV movie about teenagers looking for work.

References

External links

1979 television films
1979 films
Australian drama television films
1979 drama films
1970s English-language films
1970s Australian films